Arthur Henry "Buck" Whittemore (March 12, 1878 – August 24, 1938)
was a minor league baseball player and American football  and basketball player and coach. After playing college football at Brown University (1897, 1899–1900) and the University of Colorado (1898), he served as the head football coach at the University of South Dakota in Vermillion, South Dakota from 1902 to 1909 and 1920 to 1921.

Head coaching record

Football

References

External links
 University of South Dakota Hall of Fame profile
 
 

1878 births
1938 deaths
19th-century players of American football
American football guards
Basketball coaches from Maine
Brown Bears football players
Colorado Buffaloes football players
South Dakota Coyotes football coaches
South Dakota Coyotes men's basketball coaches
People from Alna, Maine
Players of American football from Maine